Cobalt arsenide is a binary inorganic compound of cobalt and arsenic with the chemical formula CoAs. The compound occurs naturally as the mineral modderite.

Synthesis

Physical properties
Crystallizes in the orthorhombic system, space group Pnam, parameter parameters a = 0.515 nm, b = 0.596 nm, c = 0.351 nm, Z = 4.

Isostructural with FeAs.

At approximately 6-8 GPa, single crystals of CoAs undergo a transformation to a lower-symmetry phase.

Use
CoAs is used as a semiconductor and in photo optic applications.

References

Arsenides
Cobalt(III) compounds
Semiconductors